Carex meyenii, commonly known as Meyen's sedge, is a tussock-forming species of perennial sedge in the family Cyperaceae. It is native to parts of Hawaii.

Th species was first described by the botanist Christian Gottfried Daniel Nees von Esenbeck in 1841 as published in Cyperaceae . It has two synonyms; Carex remyi and Carex brunnea var. meyenii. The type specimen was collected in 1831 by Franz Julius Ferdinand Meyen on the island of Oahu.

See also
List of Carex species

References

meyenii
Plants described in 1841
Taxa named by Christian Gottfried Daniel Nees von Esenbeck
Flora of Hawaii